The Planning (Hazardous Substances) Act 1990 was an Act of Parliament in the United Kingdom to consolidate certain enactments relating to special controls in respect of hazardous substances with amendments to give effect to recommendations of the Law Commission.

United Kingdom Acts of Parliament 1990
United Kingdom planning law